General elections were held in Northern Rhodesia on 29 September 1944.

Electoral system
The eight elected members of the Legislative Council were elected from eight single-member constituencies. There were a total of 6,527 registered voters.

Campaign
All constituencies were contested by more than one candidate with the exception of Broken Hill, where Labour Party leader Roy Welensky was returned unopposed.

The incumbent members for Livingstone and Western (Francis Sinclair), Luanshya (Michael McGann) and Nkana (Martin Visagie) did not run for re-election.

Results

Aftermath
Following the elections, a petition was sent to the Governor requesting the annulment of the result in Ndola. An enquiry by the Acting Chief Justice found that seven ballots had been improperly rejected, meaning that the result would have been a tie. A by-election was held on 4 December, in which the original winner Godfrey Pelletier opted not to run. Harold Williams was elected in his place.

See also
List of members of the Legislative Council of Northern Rhodesia (1944–48)

References

1944 in Northern Rhodesia
1944 elections in Africa
1944